Gazaneh or Gazneh may refer to:

Gazneh, Kermanshah
Gazneh, Kurdistan
Gazaneh, Mazandaran
Gazaneh, Qazvin